Levon Mkrtchyan (born February 25, 1953, in Leninakan (now Gyumri) is an Armenian director, known for his documentaries, "Davit Anhaght", "Charentz: Known and Unknown Sides", "Jean Garzu", "Mesrop Mashtots", "My Komitas", "And There Was Light", "The Manuscript of Independence" -  dedicated to the 10th anniversary of Armenia's independence, and many more. He has received the highest award of the Soviet Union, the Lenin Prize. He has earned numerous awards for his documentaries that have kept the Armenian spirit alive. His last prestigious award was received during the Golden Eagle film festival for his film "The Manuscript of Independence", in the Best Documentary category. He studied in the Directing Department of the Yerevan Fine Arts and Theater Institute. In 1978, he released his debut short film The Muses. In 1984, he graduated from the Directing Department of VGIK in Moscow. Since 1978, he has shot thirty-three documentaries. He filmed and has an archive about well known Armenians, including the only film footage on Hovhannes Shiraz, footage of Charles Aznavour visiting Armenia after the 1988 earthquake, as well as the funeral of William Saroyan. He was a close friend and film partner with the Armenian director Sergei Parajanov, and has a rare footage of him, including the last days of his life.

Filmography

1983: On the Path to Eternity (Hovhannes Shiraz)
1984: Paruyr Sevak
1987: Gyumri (Leninakan)
1987: Charents - Known and Unknown Sides
1988: Mesrop Mashtots
1989: Gurfew (Paretayin Jam, Paretayin zjam)
1989: Charles Aznavour Armenia
1990: General Andranik
1993: Armenian Kingdom of Cilicia
YouTube - Part 1: Armenian Kingdom of Cilicia
YouTube - Part 2: Armenian Kingdom of Cilicia
1996: 5 years in Armenia
2001: And There Was Light 
2002: The Manuscript of Independence
2005: Hovhannes Shiraz: A Documentary
2007: We Love Armenia

Publications
Documentary Films of the Armenian Soviet Republic, Berlin, 1990
Armenian Association of Film - Critics and Cinema - Journalists, 1924-1999
Armenians - Author Toros Toranian, Aleppo, Syria, 1998 (Թող Հայաստանը Խոսի)

External links
https://archive.today/20130114174943/http://ru.hayernaysor.am/1311339618
https://web.archive.org/web/20070604005230/http://www.arm-cinema.am/personalities/Directors/index.htm

https://web.archive.org/web/20071228092044/http://video.google.com/videoplay?docid=-5259207171967580050

1953 births
Living people
People from Gyumri
Armenian documentary filmmakers